Nash Lighthouse Meadow is a Site of Special Scientific Interest near St Donats in the Vale of Glamorgan, south Wales. It is 1.6 hectares in area, along the coastline, and includes the Nash Point Lighthouse.

See also
List of Sites of Special Scientific Interest in Mid & South Glamorgan

Sites of Special Scientific Interest in the Vale of Glamorgan
Geography of the Vale of Glamorgan
Meadows in Wales